CCSA may stand for:

 Cab Calloway School of the Arts, a magnet school for grades 6–12 in Delaware
 Canadian Centre on Substance Abuse, Canada's national addictions agency
 Central Collegiate Ski Association, an NCAA college athletic conference
 Certification in Control Self-Assessment
 China Communications Standards Association
 Cleveland Council on Soviet Anti-Semitism, founded by Louis Rosenblum  
 Clifton School (South Africa)
 Coastal Collegiate Sports Association, an NCAA Division I college athletic conference for swimming, diving and beach-volleyball
 Committee for the Coordination of Statistical Activities, a forum for good practice in statistical activities of international organizations
 Cook County State's Attorney
 Creative Commons Share Alike, a Creative Commons License permitting distribution of derivative works only under a license identical to that under which the work was released